The Rankine–Hugoniot conditions, also referred to as Rankine–Hugoniot jump conditions or Rankine–Hugoniot relations, describe the relationship between the states on both sides of a shock wave or a combustion wave (deflagration or detonation) in a one-dimensional flow in fluids or a one-dimensional deformation in solids. They are named in recognition of the work carried out by Scottish engineer and physicist William John Macquorn Rankine and French engineer Pierre Henri Hugoniot.

In a coordinate system that is moving with the discontinuity, the Rankine–Hugoniot conditions can be expressed as:
{|
 | style="text-align: right; padding-right: 1em;" | 
 | Conservation of mass
 |-
 | style="text-align: right; padding-right: 1em;" | 
 | Conservation of momentum
 |-
 | style="text-align: right; padding-right: 1em;" | 
 | Conservation of energy
 |}

where m is the mass flow rate per unit area, ρ1 and ρ2 are the mass density of the fluid upstream and downstream of the wave, u1 and u2 are the fluid velocity upstream and downstream of the wave, p1 and p2 are the pressures in the two regions, and h1 and h2 are the specific (with the sense of per unit mass) enthalpies in the two regions. If in addition, the flow is reactive, then the species conservation equations demands that

to vanish both upstream and downstream of the discontinuity. Here,  is the mass production rate of the i-th species of total N species involved in the reaction. Combining conservation of mass and momentum gives us

which defines a straight line known as the Michelson–Rayleigh line, named after Albert A. Michelson and Lord Rayleigh, that has a negative slope (since  is always positive) in the  plane. Using the Rankine–Hugoniot equations for the conservation of mass and momentum to eliminate u1 and u2, the equation for the conservation of energy can be expressed as the Hugoniot equation:

The inverse of the density can also be expressed as the specific volume, . Along with these, one has to specify the relation between the upstream and downstream equation of state

where  is the mass fraction of the species. Finally, the calorific equation of state  is assumed to be known, i.e.,

Simplified Rankine–Hugoniot relations

The following assumptions are made in order to simplify the Rankine–Hugoniot equations. The mixture is assumed to obey the ideal gas law, so that relation between the downstream and upstream equation of state can be written as

where  is the universal gas constant and the mean molecular weight  is assumed to be constant (otherwise,  would depend on the mass fraction of the all species). If one assumes that the specific heat at constant pressure  is also constant across the wave, the change in enthalpies (calorific equation of state) can be simply written as

where the first term in the above expression represents the amount of heat released per unit mass of the upstream mixture by the wave and the second term represents the sensible heating. Eliminating temperature using the equation of state and substituting the above expression for the change in enthalpies into the Hugoniot equation, one obtains a Hugoniot equation expressed only in terms of pressure and densities,

where  is the specific heat ratio. Hugoniot curve without heat release is often called as Shock Hugoniot. Along with the Rayleigh line equation, the above equation completely determines the state of the system. These two equations can be written compactly by introducing the following non-dimensional scales,

The Rayleigh line equation and the Hugoniot equation then simplifies to

Given the upstream conditions, the intersection of above two equations in the - plane determine the downstream conditions; in the - plane, the upstream condition correspond to the point . If no heat release occurs, for example, shock waves without chemical reaction, then . As mentioned in the figure, only the white region bounded by these two asymptotes are allowed so that  is positive.

On the contrary, here the specific volume ratio is restricted to the finite interval  (the upper bound is derived for the case  because pressure cannot take negative values). For diatomic gases with vibrational mode excited, we have  leading to the interval .

Derivation from Euler equations
Consider gas in a one-dimensional container (e.g., a long thin tube).  Assume that the fluid is inviscid (i.e., it shows no viscosity effects as for example friction with the tube walls).  Furthermore, assume that there is no heat transfer by conduction or radiation and that gravitational acceleration can be neglected.  Such a system can be described by the following system of conservation laws, known as the 1D Euler equations, that in conservation form is:

where
 fluid mass density, 
 fluid velocity, 
 specific internal energy of the fluid, 
 fluid pressure, and
 is the total energy density of the fluid, [J/m3], while e is its specific internal energy 

Assume further that the gas is calorically ideal and that therefore a polytropic equation-of-state of the simple form

is valid, where  is the constant ratio of specific heats .  This quantity also appears as the polytropic exponent of the polytropic process described by

For an extensive list of compressible flow equations, etc., refer to NACA Report 1135 (1953).

Note: For a calorically ideal gas  is a constant and for a thermally ideal gas  is a function of temperature. In the latter case, the dependence of pressure on mass density and internal energy might differ from that given by equation.

The jump condition
Before proceeding further it is necessary to introduce the concept of a jump condition – a condition that holds at a discontinuity or abrupt change.

Consider a 1D situation where there is a jump in the scalar conserved physical quantity , which is governed by integral conservation law

for smooth solutions.

where we have defined  (the system characteristic or shock speed), which by simple division is given by

Equation represents the jump condition for conservation law.  A shock situation arises in a system where its characteristics intersect, and under these conditions a requirement for a unique single-valued solution is that the solution should satisfy the admissibility condition or entropy condition. For physically real applications this means that the solution should satisfy the Lax entropy condition

where  and  represent characteristic speeds at upstream and downstream conditions respectively.

Shock condition
In the case of the hyperbolic conservation law, we have seen that the shock speed can be obtained by simple division.

For this situation  cannot be obtained by simple division. However, it can be shown by transforming the problem to a moving co-ordinate system

where  is the speed of sound in the fluid at upstream conditions.

Shock Hugoniot and Rayleigh line in solids 

For shocks in solids, a closed form expression such as equation cannot be derived from first principles. Instead, experimental observations indicate that a linear relation can be used instead (called the shock Hugoniot in the us-up plane) that has the form

The above relation, when combined with the Hugoniot equations for the conservation of mass and momentum, can be used to determine the shock Hugoniot in the p-v plane, where v is the specific volume (per unit mass):

Alternative equations of state, such as the Mie–Grüneisen equation of state may also be used instead of the above equation.

The shock Hugoniot describes the locus of all possible thermodynamic states a material can exist in behind a shock, projected onto a two dimensional state-state plane.  It is therefore a set of equilibrium states and does not specifically represent the path through which a material undergoes transformation.

Weak shocks are isentropic and that the isentrope represents the path through which the material is loaded from the initial to final states by a compression wave with converging characteristics.  In the case of weak shocks, the Hugoniot will therefore fall directly on the isentrope and can be used directly as the equivalent path.  In the case of a strong shock we can no longer make that simplification directly. However, for engineering calculations, it is deemed that the isentrope is close enough to the Hugoniot that the same assumption can be made.

If the Hugoniot is approximately the loading path between states for an "equivalent" compression wave, then the jump conditions for the shock loading path can be determined by drawing a straight line between the initial and final states.  This line is called the Rayleigh line and has the following equation:

Hugoniot elastic limit 
Most solid materials undergo plastic deformations when subjected to strong shocks.  The point on the shock Hugoniot at which a material transitions from a purely elastic state to an elastic-plastic state is called the Hugoniot elastic limit (HEL) and the pressure at which this transition takes place is denoted pHEL.  Values of pHEL can range from 0.2 GPa to 20 GPa.  Above the HEL, the material loses much of its shear strength and starts behaving like a fluid.

See also
 Euler equations (fluid dynamics)
 Shock polar
 Mie–Grüneisen equation of state
 Engineering Acoustics Wikibook
Atmospheric focusing

References

Equations of fluid dynamics
Scottish inventions
Conservation equations
Continuum mechanics
Combustion
Fluid dynamics